Jean E. Irving (20 April 1926–29 October 2019) was a Canadian heiress and philanthropist. She was married to James K. Irving, a member of the prominent Irving family of New Brunswick, and was well known in the province for her philanthropic work. She was awarded the Order of New Brunswick in 2013. She had an estimated net worth of 900 million dollars (1.09 billion in 2022 inflation) and donated most of her wealth by the time she died. She amassed a collection of modern art, which was donated to the Beaverbrook Art Gallery upon her death.. 

 

Her and her husband had four children, Jim Jr., Robert, Mary Jean and Colin.

References

Canadian philanthropists
Canadian women philanthropists
Members of the Order of New Brunswick
1926 births
2019 deaths